Le Château-d'Almenêches (literally 'The Château of Almenêches') is a commune in the Orne department in north-western France. Surdon station, located in the commune, is a railway junction with connections to Argentan, Caen, Paris, Le Mans and Granville.

See also
Communes of the Orne department

References

Chateaudalmeneches